Carlos Horacio Raimundo García Tello (23 January 1902 – 4 September 1988) was a Chilean footballer. He played in three matches for the Chile national football team in 1926 and 1927. He was also part of Chile's squad for the 1926 South American Championship.

References

External links
 

1902 births
1988 deaths
Chilean footballers
Chile international footballers
Place of birth missing
Association football forwards
Everton de Viña del Mar footballers